Zhu Jiahua or Chu Chia-hua (30 May 1893 – 3 January 1963) was a politician in the Republic of China. In the early 1930s he served as Minister of Communications for the Nationalist Government in Nanjing. He was the Vice Premier in 1949–1950. Zhu became acting president of Academia Sinica upon the death of Cai Yuanpei in 1940, and was responsible organizing the relocation of its institutes from China to Taiwan during the Chinese Civil War and a period of low monetary funds. Zhu repurposed funds originally set aside for Chinese students to study abroad. Although the Kuomintang government agreed with Zhu's actions when he first proposed them, Chiang Kai-shek later withdrew his approval and Zhu resigned as president of the Academia Sinica in 1957. Zhu was elected an academician of Academia Sinica in 1948. Following his death, Academia Sinica began hosting a lecture series in Zhu's honor.

See also
 List of vice premiers of the Republic of China

References

Chinese Nationalist politicians
Political office-holders in the Republic of China on Taiwan
1893 births
1963 deaths
Presidents of Sun Yat-sen University
Taiwanese people from Zhejiang
Members of Academia Sinica
Republic of China politicians from Zhejiang
Politicians from Huzhou